Sheikh Saqr bin Muhammed bin Saqr Al-Qasimi (died 2007), was a member of the royal  Al-Qasimi family, was deputy ruler of Sharjah till 1994, who lived in the town of Khor Fakkan, in the United Arab Emirates. He was an elder brother of Sheikh Sultan bin Muhammad Al-Qasimi, the Ruler of the Emirate of Sharjah, UAE.

Career 

 Head of Al-Khaleej Sports Club, the Khor Fakkan local sports club.
 Head of Khor Fakkan Municipality.

Death 

On 10 December 2007 Saqr died at age 73 in a car accident while driving his car on the Fujairah - Khor Fakkan road. His car collided with a Fujairah Municipality truck.

Middle Eastern royalty
Year of birth missing
2007 deaths
Road incident deaths in the United Arab Emirates
House of Al Qasimi